Semioptila splendida is a moth in the Himantopteridae family. It was described by Erich Martin Hering in 1937. It is found in Katanga Province in the Democratic Republic of the Congo.

References

Moths described in 1937
Himantopteridae